Bronze and Moon (Spanish: Bronce y luna) is a 1953 Spanish film directed by Javier Setó and starring José Suárez, Ana Esmeralda and Isabel de Castro.

Cast
 Francisco Albiñana 
 Barta Barri 
 Enrique Borrás 
 Jesús Colomer 
 Isabel de Castro 
 María Victoria Durá 
 Ana Esmeralda 
 Manuel Gas 
 Ramón Hernández  
 Jorge Morales 
 Ramón Quadreny 
 José Suárez 
 Francisco Tuset

References

Bibliography 
 Crusells, Magi. Directores de cine en Cataluña: de la A a la Z. Edicions Universitat Barcelona, 2009.

External links 
 

1953 films
Spanish drama films
1950s Spanish-language films
Films directed by Javier Setó
Films scored by Augusto Algueró
1950s Spanish films